Mering is a municipality in the district Aichach-Friedberg, in Bavaria, Germany. It is located on the river Paar.

First mentioned in records in 1021, Mering has a long history.

The growing town with its nearly 15,000 inhabitants (2021) profits from its good location between Munich and Augsburg. Engine of this growing popularity is the main railway station which connects Mering directly within 30 minutes to Munich and within 15 minutes to Augsburg. Although it profits from being in easy reach of big cities, one can easily get anything in Mering, from ice cream to cars. Mering is a lovely small town with many shopping facilities within easy walking distance. Its motto is "Ihr Einkaufsort der kurzen Wege" (Your shopping centre of short distances).

Worth a visit is the baroque main Catholic church St. Michael built in 1789 with its magnificent building and interior. A popular place is the recently redesigned main square (Marktplatz) with shops and restaurants in ancient buildings surrounding the fountain. Every Friday the local farmers' market takes place here when inhabitants and guests meet to buy fresh vegetables, fish and so on, or just relax by having a coffee.

Next to the river Paar, a nice area to go for a walk is by the old mill where the privately owned castle of Mering is located.

History

Mering was first mentioned in 1021. It was a family possession of the Swabian Guelph. In 1167 the Hohenstaufen Emperor Frederick I Barbarossa took by inheritance contract the Guelph house estates in Swabia, which were added to the Hohenstaufen house goods. With the beheading of the Holy Roman Emperor Conradin in 1268 the Bavarian dukes came into the possession of Mering. This was part of their efforts to extend their sphere of influence into the Alemannic settlement area, up to the Lech.

Mering belonged to the Rentamt Munich within the Electorate of Bavaria. In 1838, the municipality Mering was awarded a coat of arms by King Ludwig I, which points to the former Guelph Castle and the Battle of Lechfeld in 955. On November 18, 1911 Mering was elevated to a market town.

After being part of Bavarian territory for 700 years, Mering became part of the Swabian district Friedberg in 1944 (since the district reform in 1972, a part of the newly formed district Aichach-Friedberg), within Bavaria. In the area of Mering the Lechrain dialect is spoken, a Swabian dialect with strong Bavarian influence.

References

External links
  

Aichach-Friedberg